Bass music is a term used to describe several genres of electronic dance music and hip hop music arising from the 1980s on, focusing on a prominent bass drum and/or bassline sound. As one source notes, there are "many different types of bass music to fall into, each putting a different spin on one of music's loudest elements". Typically, the bass sound is created using synthesizers and drum machines like, for example, the influential Roland TR-808.

Electronic dance music genres of this type may include:
 Bass house
 Bassline
 Drum and bass
 Dubstep
 Footwork
 Future bass
 Glitch hop
 Midtempo bass
 Moombahton
 Trap (EDM)
 UK bass
 UK garage
 Wave
 Wonky

Hip hop genres of this type may include:
 Miami bass

See also
 Booty bass

References

Electronic dance music genres
Bass (sound)